State Road 458 (NM 458) is a  state highway in the US state of New Mexico. NM 458's western terminus is at NM 206 north of Pep, and the eastern terminus is at NM 114 south of Causey.

Major intersections

See also

References

458
Transportation in Roosevelt County, New Mexico